Richard Richardsson (born 1 February 1974 in Östersund, Sweden) is a Swedish snowboarder and Olympic medalist. He received a silver medal at the 2002 Winter Olympics in Salt Lake City.

References

1974 births
Living people
Olympic snowboarders of Sweden
Olympic silver medalists for Sweden
Snowboarders at the 1998 Winter Olympics
Snowboarders at the 2002 Winter Olympics
Snowboarders at the 2006 Winter Olympics
Swedish male snowboarders
Olympic medalists in snowboarding
Medalists at the 2002 Winter Olympics
People from Östersund
Sportspeople from Jämtland County